

World Championship

Results
 Japan 1998

 Germany 2002

 Japan 2010

 Italy 2014

 Japan 2018

 Netherlands-Poland 2022

Squads

World Cup

Results
 Japan 2007

Squads

World Grand Champions Cup

Results
 Japan 2009

 Japan 2013

Squads

World Grand Prix

Results
 Hong Kong 2002

 Italy 2003

 Italy 2004

 Japan 2005

 Italy 2006

 Japan 2008

 Japan 2009

 China 2010

 Macau 2011

 China 2012

 Japan 2013

 Japan 2014

 United States 2015

 Thailand 2016

 China 2017

Squads

Nations League

Results
 China 2018

 China 2019

 Italy 2021

 Turkey 2022

Squads

Intercontinental Olympic Qualification Tournament

Results
 Japan 2004

 Japan 2008

 Japan 2012

 Japan 2016

Squads

World Championship Qualification Tournament

Results
 China 1997

 Thailand 2001

 Thailand 2005

 China 2009

 Japan 2013

 Thailand 2017

Squads

Summer Universiade

Results
 Serbia 2009

 China 2011

 Russia 2013

 South Korea 2015

 Chinese Taipei 2017

Asian Games

Results

Squads
Women's volleyball in Thailand